(born 1953) is a Japanese ceramicist based in Kyoto. He was a late leading figure of Sōdeisha, a twentieth-century avant-garde artist group that sought to redefine understandings of aesthetics and purpose in modern and contemporary ceramics, focusing on sculptural attributes over strict functionality. Akiyama studied directly under Kazuo Yagi, one of the founders of Sōdeisha, for six years. Akiyama later became a professor at Kyoto Municipal University of Arts and Music, where he is currently a Professor Emeritus, having retired in 2018. As an artist, he works primarily with black pottery, a technique that fires clay in low temp, smoky conditions to create a dark effect. His predominantly largescale work is richly textural and abstract, emphasizing the earthy materiality of the work as well as its form.

Early life 

Akiyama was born in Shimonoseki, Yamaguchi Prefecture, in 1953. He is part of the third generation of a family of artists. He first became interested in the intuitive relationship between humans and the medium of clay in the early 1970s, while working at a school for children with intellectual disabilities. He went on to study ceramics at the Kyoto City University of the Arts, now the Kyoto Municipal University of Arts and music from 1972 to 1978, under the tutelage of Kazuo Yagi, one of the three major founders of Sōdeisha.

Work and style 

Akiyama makes primarily largescale works that often use several tons of clay and exceed 6 meters in length; however, he also produces smaller vessels that can be exhibited on pedestals. He specializes in 'non-functional' vessels, meaning that his ceramics do not have openings that can be used to contain liquids or other objects, as is standard in earlier forms of pottery. He also specializes in black pottery, a technique that involves firing clay in relatively low-temperature, smoky conditions to create a dark hue on the surface of the work. Additionally, he uses a burner to create cracks on the surface of his pieces. 

Akiyama developed and fine-tuned the latter technique in the 1980s while experimenting with the feasibility of peeling the outer skin off a ball of clay, in the same way that one might peel a fruit. To achieve this, he heated a ball of clay with a gas burner, creating a shape with a soft center and a hard, outer shell. Since that first experiment, Akiyama has refined his technique and manipulated to template to create a multitude of cracks and chasms on the surface of his pieces, in some cases completely inverting the shape. This juxtaposition of interior and the exterior is another defining characteristic of Akiyama's work, a tension that is particularly prominent in his extensive "Metavoid" series. 

Akiyama has cited clay's flexibility of form as one of the reasons that he favors it has a medium. He has said that, as an artist seeking a connection with his work and its material, his first "job" is "to create form," and the second is to "destroy it." The duality of this process requires a type of clay that will leave behind evidence of such manipulation, so Akiyama generally seeks out clay that is low in plasticity and will easily show marks, a characteristic that is not often favored by ceramicists. In an additional departure from traditional ceramics processes, Akiyama forgoes the use of a glaze to show the fired clay in its most natural form. In his view, "The more bare a clay is, the more real it is." The results are sculptures that explore the fundamental binary tensions that exist in matter including: interior and exterior, generation and decay, and continuity and division.

Flexibility of both process and results is also an important tenet of Akiyama's work. Though he draws sketches and makes mock-ups of the form he thinks a vessel might take, he also anticipates that the clay itself will play a role in dictating the final form and textures that the completed work will take. In this way, he has said that he views himself as an artist who "collaborates" with the clay, and that this creative symbiosis is a defining aspect of his oeuvre. 

His work is exhibited frequently at major museums and galleries around the world and is found in a number of collections internationally, including: The Museum of Modern Ceramic Art, Gifu; The National Museum of Art, Osaka; The National Museum of Modern Art, Tokyo; The Canadian Clay and Glass Gallery, Ontario; Honolulu Museum of Art, Hawaii; Faenza International Ceramic Museum, Italy; Minneapolis Institute of Art; The Museum of Fine Arts, Boston; The Museum of Fine Arts, Houston; and The Victoria & Albert Museum, London.

List of solo exhibitions 

 2022 - Art Court Gallery, Osaka (also in '13, '09)
 2021 - Galerie Pierre Marie Giraud (Brussels, Belgium) [also '14, '10]
 2019 - "Echoes: In the Beginning Was Clay," QM Gallery Katara, Doha, Qatar
 2018 - "Akiyamayo - Introduction with Soil-" Kyoto City University of Arts Gallery@KCUA (Kyoto)
 2016 - "To the Sea of Arcay," Musée Tomo (Hiromi Kikuchi Memorial Museum of Art), Tokyo
 2015 - Joan B. Mirviss Gallery, New York, USA [also '11, '07]
 2005 - Gallery Kochukyo, Tokyo, Japan
 2004 - INAX Tile Museum, Tokoname, Aichi, Japan
 1999 - Contemporary Art NIKI, Tokyo, Japan
 1998 - Muramatsu Gallery, Tokyo, Japan
 1991 - Shibuya Seibu Craft Gallery, Tokyo, Japan
 1988 - Shibuya Seibu Craft Gallery, Tokyo, Japan
 1987 - Gallery Nakamura, Kyoto, Japan (also in 1996)
 1987 - Gallery Koyanagi, Tokyo, Japan (also in 1996)
 1986 - INAX Gallery 2, Tokyo, Japan
 1980 - Gallery 16, Kyoto, Japan
 1976 - Gallery Iteza, Kyoto, Japan (also in 1977)

See also 

 The Japan Foundation
 Mingei
 Sōdeisha
 Kazuo Yagi
 Hikaru Yamada

References

External links
 Ibaraki Ceramic Art Museum
 Shiga Prefectural Museum of Art

Japanese artists
Japanese ceramists
1953 births
Living people